The Impala Group of Hotels is a hotel chain in northern Tanzania. The group's parent company is the Impala-based at Kijenge Estates, which was founded in 1988 by  A.M. Mrema. The group currently operates three hotels in three locations with a total of 664 rooms, 16 conference halls including the biggest in eastern Arica, Tanzania Conference Centre, with facilities for up to 7,000 people.

The group currently comprises twenty properties in Arusha. The hotels cater to the needs of tourist and business travelers. Each hotel is centrally located. The distinguishing factor of the chain is its food and beverage operations.

References

External links
 
 The Ngurdoto Mountain Lodge in Arusha
 The Impala Hotel is a business hotel
 The Naura Spring Hotel

Hotel chains
Hotels in Tanzania